ROKS Chungmugong I (PG-313) was a patrol boat in the Republic of Korea Navy between the 1940s to 1950s.

Chungmugong I was an incomplete rescue ship of Imperial Japanese Navy. After Japanese Empire was defeated, Admiral Son Won-il reinforced Jinhae shipyard. Chungmugong I was the first ship made by Jinhae shipyard, on 7 February 1947.

References

External links 
 Image of Chungmugong I
 Image of commissioned Chungmugong I

Ships built in South Korea
1946 ships
Patrol vessels of the Republic of Korea Navy